Isoptericola halalbus is a halotolerant and Gram-positive bacterium from the genus Isoptericola which has been isolated from sediments from a saline lake in Yuncheng, China.

References 

Micrococcales
Bacteria described in 2020